Concepción Badillo Díaz (born 13 July 1986) is a Spanish swimmer. She was born in Jerez de la Frontera. At the 2012 Summer Olympics she finished 39th overall in the heats in the Women's 100 metre breaststroke and failed to reach the semifinals.

Notes

References

External links
 
 
 
 

1986 births
Living people
Spanish female breaststroke swimmers
Olympic swimmers of Spain
Swimmers at the 2012 Summer Olympics
Mediterranean Games silver medalists for Spain
Mediterranean Games medalists in swimming
Swimmers at the 2009 Mediterranean Games
Sportspeople from Jerez de la Frontera
21st-century Spanish women